Alfred Albert Laun Jr. (February 14, 1905 in New Holstein, Wisconsin – November 4, 1964), was a member of the Wisconsin State Senate. He attended Oberlin College before graduating cum laude from Harvard University.

Career
Laun was elected to the Senate in 1954 and was re-elected in 1958. He was a delegate to the 1956 Republican National Convention. In addition, he was a presidential elector that year.

References

People from New Holstein, Wisconsin
Republican Party Wisconsin state senators
Oberlin College alumni
Harvard University alumni
1905 births
1964 deaths
20th-century American politicians